The 1948 Fordham Rams football team represented Fordham University as an independent during the 1948 college football season. The Rams went 3-6 and amassed 182 points while their defense allowed 192 points.

Schedule

References

Fordham
Fordham Rams football seasons
Fordham Rams football